Arbeiterpost ('Workers Mail') was a German language socialist newspaper published from Gleiwitz, Upper Silesia, Weimar Germany (present-day Gliwice in Poland) between December 1919 and March 1920. Arbeiterpost was the organ of the regional organization of the Independent Social Democratic Party of Germany (USPD) in Upper Silesia.

References

1919 establishments in Europe
1920 disestablishments in Europe
Defunct newspapers published in Germany
German-language newspapers published in Europe
Newspapers established in 1919
Publications disestablished in 1920
Gliwice
Socialist newspapers